"Microwaved" is a song from English industrial metal band Pitchshifter. It is the second single from their fourth full-length album, www.pitchshifter.com.

The song was featured on the video games Twisted Metal 3 and Test Drive 5, both for the PlayStation.

Track listing

UK 7" version
"Microwaved"
"Genius (Deejay Punk Roc Dubalicious Mix)"

US 7" version 
"Microwaved"
"Genius"

12" version
"Microwaved (LP Version)"
"Genius (Deejay Punk-Roc Dubalicious Mix)"
"Genius (Lunatic Calm Mix)"

Charts

References

1998 songs
Pitchshifter songs